In a Metal Mood: No More Mr. Nice Guy is a 1997 album by American singer Pat Boone in which Boone covers hard rock and heavy metal songs in a jazz/big band style. Boone promoted the album by appearing in leather clothing (and, at that year's American Music Awards, wearing a dog collar). He succeeded in propelling Metal Mood onto the Billboard record charts (making it Boone's first hit album in 36 years), but it did not please some of his older, longtime fans who considered the heavy metal genre in bad taste, or worse. The album has since become somewhat popular as a joke gift to metal fans (as often indicated in reviews given to it) although some serious sites have given it good reviews on its own merits. The album featured guest appearances from well-known rock musicians such as Ronnie James Dio and Ritchie Blackmore.

In October of the same year, and in a similar vein, Steve Lawrence and Eydie Gormé covered Soundgarden's "Black Hole Sun" in a lounge-jazz style on the 1997 compilation album release, Lounge-A-Palooza. This idea of giving rock hits a "standards" treatment was imitated later by Boone's contemporary Paul Anka in the 2005 album Rock Swings, which also featured Anka doing a cover of "Black Hole Sun".

Track listing
 "You've Got Another Thing Comin'"  (Original: Judas Priest)  – 4:19
 "Smoke on the Water" (Original: Deep Purple)  – 3:53
 "It's a Long Way to the Top (If You Wanna Rock 'n' Roll)" (Original: AC/DC)  – 4:37
 "Panama"  (Original: Van Halen)  – 5:15
 "No More Mr. Nice Guy" (Original: Alice Cooper)  – 3:06
 "Love Hurts"  (Original: Everly Brothers, popularized as a hard rock ballad by Nazareth; composed by Boudleaux Bryant)  – 4:57
 "Enter Sandman"  (Original: Metallica)  – 3:52
 "Holy Diver" (Original: Dio)  – 4:44
 "Paradise City"  (Original: Guns N' Roses)  – 4:41
 "The Wind Cries Mary" (Original: The Jimi Hendrix Experience)  – 4:12
 "Crazy Train"  (Original: Ozzy Osbourne)  – 4:32
 "Stairway to Heaven"  (Original: Led Zeppelin)  – 4:59

Personnel

 Pat Boone, Ronnie James Dio, Clydene Jackson Edwards, Merry Clayton, Carmen Twillie - vocals
 Ritchie Blackmore, Mitch Holder, Dawayne Bailey, Dweezil Zappa, Dan Ferguson, Michael Thompson - electric guitar
 Doug Cameron, Bruce Dukov, Michelle Richards - violin
 Evan Wilson - viola
 Larry Corbett - cello
 Tom Scott, Gary Herbig, Don Menza, Pete Christlieb, Terry Harrington, Plas Johnson, Jeol Peskin - woodwinds
 Frank Szabo, Chuck Findley, Wayne Bergeron, Rick Baptist, Chris Tedesco - trumpet
 Dick "Slide" Hyde, Lew McCreary, Alan Kaplan, Bruce Otto, Dana Hughes - trombone
 Dave Siebels - organ, keyboards
 Andy Simpkins - acoustic bass
 Marco Mendoza - electric bass
 Gregg Bissonette - drums
 Lenny Castro - percussion
 Sheila E. - timbales

Chart performance

See also
 Richard Cheese
 Frank Bennett
 The Mike Flowers Pops

References

1997 albums
Covers albums
Hip-O Records albums
Pat Boone albums